Arzak is a restaurant in San Sebastián, Spain.  It features New Basque Cuisine.  In 2008, Arzak's owner and chef, Juan Mari Arzak, was awarded the Universal Basque award for "adapting gastronomy, one of the most important traditions of the Basque Country, to the new times and making of it one of the most innovative of the world".

Description 
Arzak serves modernized Basque cuisine, inspired by cooking techniques and presentation found in nouvelle cuisine. The restaurant is inside an old multiple-storied brick building, with the restaurant on the main floor. Above the restaurant is a wine cellar with over 100,000 bottles of wine, as well as a test kitchen. The test kitchen, established in 2000, is where the Arzaks come up with new recipes and methods. It houses over 1500 ingredients that can potentially serve as inspiration for a dish. Assisted by chefs Igor Zalacain and Xabi Gutiérrez, the Arzak test kitchen comes up with 40 new dishes a year, stemming from recipes that are created and refined over a period of three to six months.

History

Built as a house in 1897 by the current owner's grandparents (José Maria Arzak Etxabe and Escolastica Lete), they turned it into a wine inn and tavern.  At the time, the village of Alza was separate from San Sebastián.  When the next generation took over (Juan Ramon Arzak and Francisca Arratibel), it was turned into a restaurant. Kitchen duties are now shared between Juan Mari Arzak and his daughter Elena Arzak.

Awards and honors 
1989–present, Michelin Guide Three Stars 
2003–present, Restaurant (magazine) S.Pellegrino World's 50 Best Restaurants
2013, 8th best restaurant in the world, S. Pellegrino

References

External links
 
 Arzak biography. A Teacher with the Eyes of a Child 

Michelin Guide starred restaurants in Spain
Basque cuisine
Molecular gastronomy
Buildings and structures in Gipuzkoa
San Sebastián